Tahrud (also Romanized as Tahrūd and Tahrood) is a village in Rigan Rural District, in the Central District of Rigan County, Kerman Province, Iran. At the 2006 census, its population was 901, in 228 families.

References 

Populated places in Rigan County